Events from the year 1573 in India.

Events
 Sidi Saiyyed Mosque, Ahmedabad built.

Births
 May 13 – Taj Bibi Bilqis Makani, later became the wife of Mughal Emperor Jahangir and mother of Mughal Emperor Shah Jahan (died 1619)

Deaths

See also

 Timeline of Indian history